60558 Echeclus  is a centaur, approximately  in diameter, located in the outer Solar System. It was discovered by Spacewatch in 2000 and initially classified as a minor planet with provisional designation  (also written 2000 EC98). Research in 2001 by Rousselot and Petit at the Besançon observatory in France indicated that it was not a comet, but in December 2005 a cometary coma was detected. In early 2006 the Committee on Small Bodies Nomenclature (CSBN) gave it the cometary designation 174P/Echeclus. It last came to perihelion in April 2015, and was expected to reach about apparent magnitude 16.7 near opposition in September 2015.

Name 

Echeclus  is a centaur in Greek mythology.

60558 Echeclus is only the second comet (after Chiron) that was named as a minor planet, rather than after the name of its discoverer. Chiron is also a centaur; other centaurs are being observed for signs of a cometary coma.

Chunk 

On 30 December 2005, when 13.1 AU from the Sun, a large chunk of Echeclus was observed to break off, causing a great cloud of dust. Astronomers have speculated this could have been caused by an impact or by an explosive release of volatile substances.

Outbursts 
Echeclus appears to have outburst again around June 2011 when it was 8.5 AU from the Sun. On 24 June 2011, follow up imaging with the 2 meter Haleakala-Faulkes Telescope South showed the coma of Echeclus to be very close to the sky background limit.

Echeclus outburst again around 7 December 2017 when it was 7.3 AU from the Sun, and was 4 magnitudes brighter than expected.

Presence of gas 

In 2016, carbon monoxide was detected in Echeclus in very small amounts, and the derived CO production rate was calculated to be sufficient to account for the observed coma. The calculated CO production rate from Echeclus is substantially lower than what is typically observed for 29P/Schwassmann–Wachmann, another distantly active comet often classified as a centaur.

Orbit 
Echeclus came to perihelion in April 2015.

Centaurs have short dynamical lives due to strong interactions with the giant planets. Echeclus is estimated to have an orbital half-life of about 610,000 years.

See also

References

External links 
Elements and Ephemeris for 174P/Echeclus (IAU Minor Planet Center)
 BAA Comet Section : Comets discovered in 2006
 60558 - 0174P/ Echeclus (2011 June 8)
 Comet 174P Echeclus chased by Asteroid 2716 Tuulikki (Animation by Joseph Brimacombe on 30 May 2011)
 Comet 174P/ Echeclus during its 2016 outburst (Virtual Telescope Project)
 
 

Centaurs (small Solar System bodies)
060558
0174
060558
Named minor planets
20000303